Edythe Kirchmaier (nee King, January 22, 1908 – October 24, 2015) was a United States woman, who at 105 was the oldest user of social media site Facebook, the oldest registered driver in California and the oldest living former graduate of University of Chicago.

Biography

On January 22, 2013, she signed up to Facebook on her 105th birthday. Facebook engineers however had to "decode" information, as her birth year was not recognized She was the University of Chicago's oldest living former graduate, and resided in Santa Barbara, California. She was also a graduate of Ohio State University and Springfield High School in Ohio.

In retirement, she volunteered once a week for the charity Direct Relief. She was the eldest registered driver in California and had a perfect record during her 86 years as a motorist. She was donated a Honda Civic to help her work with her organisation after her caravan was destroyed.

She was married for over 70 years.  Her husband died in 2008 at age 98, when she was 100 years of age.

Media appearances
She was featured on The Ellen DeGeneres Show, The Tonight Show with Jay Leno, Today, and on the Oprah Winfrey Network program Super Soul Sunday, for her volunteer work at Direct Relief.

Death
She died at the age of 107 on October 24, 2015.

References

External links
 Official page

1908 births
2015 deaths
American centenarians
Ohio State University alumni
University of Chicago alumni
People from Springfield, Ohio
People from Santa Barbara, California
Women centenarians